ICMC may refer to:

 International Catholic Migration Commission
 International Computer Music Conference
 The Indiana College Mathematics Competition
International Cryptographic Module Conference
 Integrated Currency Management Centre
 Inter College Music Competition
 Integrated Call Management Centre